The Nokia 6101, 6102, and 6102i are a line of popular Nokia mid-level clamshell cellphones that operate on GSM-850/1800/1900  MHz (some markets are GSM-900/1800/1900 MHz) frequencies released between middle 2005 and early 2006. The line was given the nickname Ediphix by Nokia employees.

The differences between the 6101 and 6102 are very small and the only visible differences are the style of the keypads and front bezel plate. The 6102i is an updated version of the 6102 featuring Bluetooth capabilities and increased memory space. Another updated version of the 6101/6102 is the Nokia 6103.

Announced in 2005, the Nokia 6101 was also one of the last Nokia phones that still had an external antenna.

Its direct successor is the Nokia 6131, which includes microSD card slot and native USB connectivity.

Specifications
Weight: 5 Ounces 
Dimensions: 3.35 x 1.77 x  
Two color displays: 128 x 160 pixel internal display with up to 65,536 colors and external mini display 
Indicators for battery power and signal strength (audible indicators for both also available)

Nokia 6101 full phone specification
Below are the complete specification of Nokia 6101

Complete list of 6102i specifications
The complete Nokia 6103 / 6102i list of specifications are :

Sources

6101
Mobile phones introduced in 2005
Mobile phones with infrared transmitter